Ablahad Afraim Sawa was a member of the National Assembly of Iraq who was elected on the Kurdistani Alliance slate. A member of the Chaldean Democratic Union, he was also elected in January 2005

References

1948 births
Living people
Chaldean Catholics
Members of the Council of Representatives of Iraq
Chaldean Democratic Party politicians
Iraqi Christians